The 43rd South American Swimming Championships were held between March 30 and April 3, 2016 in Asunción, Paraguay.

Participating countries
Countries which sent teams were:

Results

Men's events

Legend:

Women's events

Legend:

Mixed events

Medal standings
Final medal standings for the 2016 South American Swimming Championships are:

References

External links 
 2016 South American Swimming Champs Results

South American Swimming Championships
South American Swimming Championships
South American Swimming Championships
Swimming competitions in Paraguay
International sports competitions hosted by Paraguay
International sports competitions in Asunción
South American Swimming Championships
South American Swimming Championships